Langwert is a smock mill in Winsum, Friesland, Netherlands which was built in 1979 and is under restoration. It is listed as a Rijksmonument.

History
Langwert formerly stood on different site in Winsum, where it was known as the Molen van Tjilbert. The mill was moved to its current site in 1979, replacing a mill that had been built in 1863 and that had burnt down on 13 March 1974. The work was done by a carpenter from Winsum with assistance from millwright Westra of Franeker, Friesland. The mill was damaged in a storm in September 2011. Restoration by Kolthof Bouwbedrijf bv of Stiens, Friesland began in the summer of 2014. It is listed as a Rijksmonument, №8529.

Description

Langwert is what the Dutch describe as a Grondzeiler. It is a one-storey smock mill on a single storey base. There is no stage, the sails reaching almost to ground level. The mill is winded by tailpole and winch. The smock and cap are clad in vertical boards. The sails are Common sails. The sails are carried on a wooden windshaft. The windshaft carries the brake wheel which has 35 cogs. This drives the wallower (18 cogs) at  the top of the upright shaft. At the bottom of the upright shaft there are two crown wheels The upper crown wheel, which has 30 cogs drives an Archimedes' screw via a crown wheel. The lower crown wheel, which has 31 cogs is carried on the axle of an Archimedes' screw, which is used to drain the polder. The screw is  diameter. It is inclined at 21°. Each revolution of the screw lifts  of water.

Public access
De Beintemapoldermolen is usually open on Sunday afternoons, or by appointment.

References

Windmills in Friesland
Windmills completed in 1979
Smock mills in the Netherlands
Windpumps in the Netherlands
Agricultural buildings in the Netherlands
Rijksmonuments in Friesland
Octagonal buildings in the Netherlands
Waadhoeke